Wolfram Koppen (1 February 1939 – 17 April 2011) was a German judoka. He competed in the men's lightweight event at the 1972 Summer Olympics.

References

1939 births
2011 deaths
German male judoka
Olympic judoka of West Germany
Judoka at the 1972 Summer Olympics
Sportspeople from Hamburg
20th-century German people